Ibrahima Gueye is the name of:

Ibrahima Gueye (athlete)
Ibrahima Gueye (footballer, born 1978), Senegalese footballer
Ibrahima Gueye (footballer, born 1996), Senegalese footballer